Dil Ruba is a 2020 Pakistani television series premiered on 28 March 2020 on Hum TV. It is directed by Ali Hasan, written by Qaisra Hayat and produced by Momina Duraid under MD Productions. The serial stars Hania Amir as an Internet celebrity, who is popular on a video-sharing social platform. It also stars Shehroz Sabzwari, Syed Jibran, Mohib Mirza, Asad Siddiqui, Ghana Ali, Laila Wasti and Marina Khan in supporting roles.

Plot
Protagonist Sanam (Hania Aamir) is a normal teenager with all normal social media stuff. She is a TikToker and her beauty enchants all the men she meets. She speaks to multiple men on her phone and has everyone dancing to her tune which she uses as a mean for getting benefits from men.

Cast 

 Hania Aamir as Sanam Jameel
 Shehroz Sabzwari as Junaid
 Mohib Mirza as Sabih Ul Hassan
 Nabeel Zuberi as Razi Ul Hassan
 Syed Jibran as Khurram Shahzad
 Asad Siddiqui as Ayaz
 Laila Wasti as Samiya
 Ghana Ali as Natasha
 Khalid Anam as Junaid's father
 Marina Khan as Ghazala
 Huma Nawab as Junaid's mother
 Dur-e-Fishan Saleem as Erum
 Shehryar Zaidi as Daniyal
 Raeed Muhammad Alam as Farhaad
 Amber Khan as Shagufta
 Saad Azhar as Arsalan
 Khalifa Sajeeruddin as Jameel
 Mirza Rizwan as Asad
 Hafsa Butt as Zoya
 Zain Afzal

Reception

First episode of the serial garnered 7.8 TRP and 7 million views on YouTube. Amir's portrayal of Sanam was praised by critics. It was also praised for its topic and for its accurate portrayal of life of teenage girls in 21st century. Oyeah.pk gave it 3.9 out of 5 stars.

Awards and nominations

References

External links 

Official website

Pakistani television series
2020 Pakistani television series debuts
Hum TV original programming
Urdu-language television shows
Pakistani television series endings